Mercury House may refer to:

 Mercury House (publishers), a book publishing company based in San Francisco
 Mercury House (London building), a building in London, headquarters of Cable and Wireless